Raymond Charles "Crusoe" Robertson-Glasgow (15 July 1901 – 4 March 1965) was a Scottish cricketer and cricket writer.

Early life
Robertson-Glasgow was born in Edinburgh to a Scottish soldier and the daughter of an East Anglian clergyman. Their marriage was an unhappy one, and Robertson-Glasgow's mother was inattentive to her two sons. He won a scholarship to Charterhouse School and went on to Corpus Christi College, Oxford. Although he enjoyed university life, it was while at Oxford that he began to experience the periodical depression that he was to struggle with for the rest of his life.

Cricket
Robertson-Glasgow was a right-arm fast-medium bowler and useful tail-end batsman who played for Oxford University and Somerset in a first-class career that lasted from 1920 to 1937. In all he took 464 wickets at 25.77 in first-class cricket, with best innings figures of 9 for 38 when Somerset defeated Middlesex at Lord's in June 1924.

Convivial, popular and humorous, Robertson-Glasgow subsequently won acclaim for his writing, in which his strong sense of humour shone through. In 1933 he became cricket correspondent for the Morning Post.  He later wrote for the Daily Telegraph, The Observer and the Sunday Times. He retired from regular cricket writing in 1953. He was Chairman of the Cricket Writers' Club in 1959.

His nickname of "Crusoe" came, according to Robertson-Glasgow himself, from the Essex batsman Charlie McGahey. When his captain asked McGahey how he had been dismissed, he replied: "I was bowled by an old ----- I thought was dead two thousand years ago, called Robinson Crusoe."

Death
Robertson-Glasgow committed suicide during a snowstorm whilst in the grip of melancholic depression.

Books
Robertson-Glasgow's cricket books include:

Cricket Prints: Some Batsmen and Bowlers (1920-1940) (Werner Laurie, 1948)
More Cricket Prints: Some Batsmen and Bowlers (1920-1945) (1948)
46 Not Out - an autobiography (1948)
Rain Stopped Play (1948)
The Brighter Side of Cricket (Arthur Barker, 1950)
All in the Game (1952)
How to Become a Test Cricketer (1962)
Crusoe on Cricket: The Cricket Writings of R. C. Robertson-Glasgow (1966)

He also wrote the following non-cricket books:

I was Himmler's Aunt (1940)
No Other Land (1942)
Country Talk: A Miscellany (1964)

References

External links 
 
R.C. Robertson-Glasgow at Cricket Archive
Wisden obituary

1901 births
1965 deaths
1965 suicides
Cricketers from Edinburgh
People educated at Charterhouse School
Alumni of Corpus Christi College, Oxford
English cricketers
Oxford University cricketers
Somerset cricketers
Marylebone Cricket Club cricketers
Gentlemen cricketers
Cricket historians and writers
Suicides in England
Free Foresters cricketers
Harlequins cricketers
Gentlemen of England cricketers
Oxford and Cambridge Universities cricketers
H. D. G. Leveson Gower's XI cricketers